Wacky cake, also called crazy cake, Joe cake, wowie cake, and WW II cake, is a spongy, cocoa-based cake.  It is unique in that unlike many pastries and desserts, no eggs, butter or milk are used to make the cake batter.

Wacky cake may have been created as the result of rationing during World War II, when milk and eggs were scarce.  Active ingredients in wacky cake include flour, sugar, cocoa powder, baking soda, vegetable oil, white vinegar, salt and vanilla extract.  The eggless batter means that the structure of the cake is entirely supported by gluten, which is strengthened by the acidic vinegar and salt.

Wacky cake is typically prepared by mixing dry ingredients in a baking pan and forming three hollows in the mixture, into which oil, vinegar, and vanilla are poured. Warm water is then poured over, and the ingredients mixed and baked.

Some recipes add brewed coffee as an additional ingredient. The cake may be topped with icing or confectioner's sugar, or even served plain.

The cake is a popular delicacy at bake sales in numerous rural regions of the United States.

See also
 Depression cake

References

Cakes
Chocolate desserts